George Wright (born 20 February 1963) is a Canadian athlete. He competed in the men's triple jump at the 1988 Summer Olympics.

References

1963 births
Living people
Athletes (track and field) at the 1988 Summer Olympics
Canadian male triple jumpers
Olympic track and field athletes of Canada
Place of birth missing (living people)